Seaham is a railway station on the Durham Coast Line, which runs between Newcastle and Middlesbrough via Hartlepool. It is owned by Network Rail and managed by Northern Trains.

History
The first railway route into the town, the Seaham and Sunderland Railway, was built as a means of exporting coal from nearby collieries owned by the Marquess of Londonderry. It opened in 1854, and ran from Seaham Harbour to Ryhope Grange, near Sunderland, where it joined with the North Eastern Railway.

The station was opened to passengers by the Londonderry, Seaham and Sunderland Railway on 2 July 1855, and was originally known as Seaham Colliery.

In 1900, the North Eastern Railway purchased the line. To create a new coastal route between Sunderland, Hartlepool and Middlesbrough, the line was extended south along the coast, with the section between Seaham and to  opening on 1 April 1905. 

Upon the opening of the line, a new through station (current station) was constructed. On 1 March 1925, the (current) station was renamed from Seaham Colliery to Seaham. On the same day, the nearby harbour station was renamed from Seaham to Seaham Harbour, closing to passengers fourteen years later, on 11 September 1939.

Facilities
The station facilities were improved during the 2010s to include fully lit waiting shelters and CCTV. The long-line Public Address system (PA) was renewed and upgraded with pre-recorded announcements.

The station is unstaffed, but a self-service ticket machine is provided on the northbound platform to allow passengers to buy tickets before boarding or to collect pre-paid tickets. Train running information is offered via timetable posters, digital CIS displays and automatic announcements.  Step-free access is available to both platforms.

Services 

As of the May 2021 timetable change, the station is served by an hourly service between Newcastle and Middlesbrough. Most trains continue to Hexham (or Carlisle on Sunday) and Nunthorpe. Two trains per day (three on Sunday) continue to Whitby. All services are operated by Northern Trains.

Rolling stock used: Class 156 Super Sprinter and Class 158 Express Sprinter

References

Sources

External links 
 
 

Railway stations in County Durham
DfT Category F1 stations
Former North Eastern Railway (UK) stations
Railway stations in Great Britain opened in 1855
Northern franchise railway stations
Seaham